The BBCH-scale (rice) identifies the phenological development stages of rice Oryza sativa.  It is a plant species specific version of the BBCH-scale.

1 A leaf is unfolded when its ligule is visible or the tip of the next leaf is visible
2 Tillering or stem elongation may occur earlier than stage 13; in this case continue with stages 21 or 30
3 If stem elongation begins before the end of tillering continue with stage 30
4 Flowering usually starts before stage 55; continue with principal stage 6

References

External links
A downloadable version of the BBCH Scales 

BBCH-scale
Rice